Dam Ab Bahareh-ye Chin (also Romanized as Dam Āb Bahāreh-ye Chīn) is a village in Chin Rural District, Ludab District, Boyer-Ahmad County, Kohgiluyeh and Boyer-Ahmad Province, Iran. At the 2006 census, its population was 175, in 33 families.

References 

Populated places in Boyer-Ahmad County